Polyommatus artvinensis is a butterfly in the family Lycaenidae. It was described by Frédéric Carbonell in 1997. It is found in Turkey, where it is only known from the north-eastern Pontic chain, in the provinces of Erzurum and Artvin.

The length of the forewings is 13.5–16 mm. The upperside ground colour is purplish violet. The underside ground colour is warm greyish brown, without any or at most a vestigial blue-green basal suffusion.

References

Butterflies described in 1997
Polyommatus
Butterflies of Asia